Buchanan is a town in Outagamie County, Wisconsin, United States. The population was 6,755 at the 2010 census.  The unincorporated community of Darboy is located in the town.

Geography
According to the United States Census Bureau, the town has a total area of 16.9 square miles (43.8 km2), of which, 16.6 square miles (43.0 km2) of it is land and 0.3 square miles (0.9 km2) of it (2.01%) is water.

Demographics
According to several censuses as of July 1, 2019, there were 7,201 people and 2,678 households. As of the census of 2010, the population density was 440.5 people per square mile (170.1/km2). The racial makeup of the town was 94.4% White, 3.4% Hispanic or Latino, 0.7% from two or more races and 0.4% Asian.

The average number of people per household was 2.66 and 4.9% of households spoke a language other than English.

In the town, the population was spread out, with 6.5% under the age of 5, 26.5% under the age of 18, 73.5% over the age of 18 and 9.6% above the age of 65. The percentage of females was 51.1%.

The median income for a household was $89,028. 5.9% of the population lives in poverty.

Business
Wisconsin International Raceway is located on County Road KK, East of Highway 55 in the town of Buchanan.

References

External links
Town of Buchanan, Wisconsin website

Towns in Outagamie County, Wisconsin
Towns in Wisconsin
Appleton–Fox Cities metropolitan area